Gina-Lisa Lohfink (born 23 September 1986) is a German model and TV and media personality.

Early life 
Lohfink was born on 23 September 1986 in Seligenstadt, Hesse. After finishing school, she trained as a nurse and worked as a fitness trainer. She has heterochromia; her right eye is green and her left eye is blue.

In 2015, Lohfink revealed she suffers from congenital heart defect.

Career

Pageantry 
Lohfink won Miss Frankfurt 2005, Miss Darmstadt 2006 and Queen of the World/Internet 2007. She was Miss Supermodel at Miss Hawaiian Tropic International 2007.

Modelling 
In 2006, Lohfink modelled for clothing label Southpole. In 2008, she participated on the third cycle of Germany's Next Topmodel, being selected as one of the nineteen finalists. Despite being a fan favorite, she finished in twelfth place. She has shot for numerous men's magazines such as Playboy, Penthouse and FHM. Later in 2008, she starred in an ad campaign for Sixt alongside centenarian actor Johannes Heesters. In February 2010, she walked in New York Fashion Week for Heatherette designer Richie Rich for his collection A*MUSE. In 2012, she starred in a campaign for Redcoon with fellow Germany's Next Topmodel contestant and model Micaela Schäfer.

Television and acting 
Lohfink has appeared in television shows such as taff, Gülcan und Collien ziehen aufs Land, Maischberger, Mieten, kaufen, wohnen, Das perfekte Promi-Dinner (German spin-off to Come Dine with Me), Die Alm, Bauer sucht Frau, and Big Brother Germany as well as her own web series Gina-Lisa's Welt and Gina-Lisa's Best Buddy.

She made her acting debut in 2008 in the television comedy show Putzfrau Undercover. Since then she has appeared in the comedy show Marienhof and The Vampire Club, a short film by Marc Terenzi. She starred in the 2011 production of Grease in Frankfurt, and also appeared in the music video for Loona's single "El Tiburón".

Other work 

In 2009, Lohfink founded Ginalisa Eyewear, a brand of sunglasses.

In 2010, she released her debut single, "Alles Klar".

In 2012, she was the face of Venus, an erotic fair, promoting safer sex.

Legal issues 
In January 2016, Lohfink was ordered to pay a €24,000 fine, when the Amtsgericht Tiergarten court in Berlin ruled that she had falsely accused two men of raping her, after a video of a sexual encounter with them surfaced on the Internet. Lohfink appealed the decision, but to no avail.

References 

Living people
1986 births
People from Seligenstadt
Top Model contestants
Big Brother (franchise) contestants
German beauty pageant winners
German female models
21st-century German actresses
German soap opera actresses
German television actresses
German television personalities
German fashion designers
German women pop singers
False allegations of sex crimes
21st-century German women singers
Ich bin ein Star – Holt mich hier raus! participants
German women fashion designers